Philippe Panneton (or Joseph-Philippe Panneton, pseudonym Ringuet, which was his mother's maiden name; April 30, 1895 – December 28, 1960) was a Canadian physician, academic, diplomat and writer.

Born in Trois-Rivières, Quebec, he received a degree in medicine from Université Laval in 1920. In 1935 he became a professor at the Université de Montréal. In 1944 he was a founding member of L'Académie canadienne-française (now known as the Académie des lettres du Québec) and served as its president from 1947 until 1953. In 1956, he was named ambassador to Portugal, and died in Lisbon in 1960.

In 1959 he was awarded the Lorne Pierce Medal.

Selected works
 Trente arpents (Paris, 1938), winner of the 1940 Governor General's Award for fiction
 Thirty Acres, Oxford University Press, New Canadian Library (1940). Afterword by Antoine Sirois, translated by Felix and Dorothea Walter
 Dreißig Morgen Land. Ein kanadischer Roman. Transl. Franziska Maria Tenberg. Benziger, Einsiedeln [1940] (German)
 Extraction: Gott die Schuldigkeit erweisen, in: Gute Wanderschaft, mein Bruder. Transl. Carl Scharfenberger. St. Benno, Leipzig 1986 (German)
 Un Monde était leur empire / Their Empire Was a World (1943)
 L'Héritage et autres contes / The Legacy and Other Stories (1946)
 "The Heritage", translated by Morna Scott Stoddart, in Robert Weaver, Canadian Short stories, Oxford University Press, p. 82—First published in the Tamarack Review (1960)
 Fausse Monnaie / Counterfeit (1947)
 Le Poids du Jour / The Burden of the Day (1949)

References

External links
 

1895 births
1960 deaths
Writers from Quebec
Canadian male novelists
People from Trois-Rivières
Governor General's Award-winning fiction writers
Université Laval alumni
20th-century Canadian novelists
Canadian novelists in French
20th-century Canadian male writers
Burials at Notre Dame des Neiges Cemetery
Canadian expatriates in Portugal